Air Vice Marshal Derek Thomas Bryant,  (born 1 November 1933) is a former Royal Air Force officer who served as Commandant of the RAF Staff College, Bracknell from 1987 until his retirement in 1989.

RAF career
Educated at Latymer Upper School in Hammersmith, Bryant joined the Royal Air Force in 1953. He became Station Commander at RAF Coningsby in 1976, Senior Air Staff Officer No. 38 Group in 1982 and Deputy Commander Royal Air Force Germany in 1986. He went on to be Commandant of the RAF Staff College, Bracknell in 1987 before retiring in 1989.

References

External links 
 Bryant's entry at Who's Who

1933 births
Companions of the Order of the Bath
Officers of the Order of the British Empire
Royal Air Force air marshals
Living people
People educated at Latymer Upper School
Royal Air Force officers